Letts Corner is an unincorporated community in Sand Creek Township, Decatur County, Indiana.

History
Letts Corner was originally the name given to the railroad station of nearby Letts. Lett was the name of a family in the area.

Geography

References

Unincorporated communities in Decatur County, Indiana
Unincorporated communities in Indiana